Laura Letrari (born 8 March 1989) is an Italian swimmer. At the 2012 Summer Olympics, she competed for the national team in the women's 4 × 100-metre freestyle relay; however, they finished in 12th place in the heats, failing to reach the final.

References

External links

1989 births
Living people
Italian female freestyle swimmers
Olympic swimmers of Italy
Swimmers at the 2012 Summer Olympics
Mediterranean Games gold medalists for Italy
Swimmers at the 2009 Mediterranean Games
Swimmers at the 2018 Mediterranean Games
Universiade medalists in swimming
Mediterranean Games medalists in swimming
Sportspeople from Brixen
Universiade gold medalists for Italy
Medalists at the 2015 Summer Universiade